Qom County is in Qom province, Iran. The capital of the county is the city of Qom. At the 2006 census, the county's population was 1,036,714, in 262,313 households. The following census in 2011 counted 1,151,672 people in 320,977 households. At the 2016 census, the county's population was 1,292,283 in 383,532 households. After the census, Jafarabad District was separated from the county to form Jafarabad County, and Nofel Loshato District to become Kahak County.

Administrative divisions

The population history and structural changes of Qom County's administrative divisions over three consecutive censuses are shown in the following table. The latest census shows five districts, nine rural districts, and six cities.

References

 

Counties of Qom Province